Incarnate may refer to:

Incarnation, a religious concept similar to divine embodiment and manifestation
"Incarnation", a song by Vader from the album De Profundis
Incarnate (Dungeons & Dragons), the role-playing game character class
Incarnate (The Obsessed album), an album by The Obsessed
Incarnate (Killswitch Engage album), an album by Killswitch Engage
Incarnate (comics), a comic book mini-series
Incarnate (film), a 2016 horror film
University of the Incarnate Word, a private Catholic university
Incarnate, a book by Ramsey Campbell
Rise of Incarnates, a fighting video game by Bandai Namco Games